Warwick is an unincorporated community in Sussex County, Delaware, United States. Warwick is located on Delaware Route 24, east of Millsboro and north of the Indian River.

References

Unincorporated communities in Sussex County, Delaware
Unincorporated communities in Delaware